American Flyers Airline Flight 280/D was a flight operated on a U.S. Military Air Command contract from Monterey Regional Airport in California to Columbus Airport in Georgia, via Ardmore Municipal Airport, Oklahoma. On April 22, 1966, while approaching Runway 8 at Ardmore, the aircraft overshot the runway and crashed into a hill, bursting into flames. Eighty-three of the 98 passengers and crew on board died as a result of the accident.

Aircraft
The aircraft was a Lockheed L-188 Electra four-engined turboprop airline registered as N183H.  It had first flown in January 1961 and was bought by American Flyers Airline in January 1963. It is the same plane that carried the Beatles from city to city in 1964 during their second tour of the U.S.

Investigation
The U.S. Civil Aeronautics Board (CAB) investigated the accident.

Investigators found no evidence of mechanical failure or defect. Some days after the crash, it was learned that the pilot, Reed Pigman, who also happened to be the president of American Flyers, was under care for arteriosclerosis. An autopsy of Pigman determined his cause of death to either be multiple injuries or coronary artery sclerosis.

It was also determined that Reed Pigman had falsified his application for a first-class medical certificate. He had not disclosed that he was diabetic or that he had a history of heart issues dating back almost two decades; either of these would have been disqualifying factors for the certificate.

On March 28, 1967, the CAB published its final report.  The CAB determined that the probable cause for the accident was:

References

Accidents and incidents involving the Lockheed L-188 Electra
Aviation accidents and incidents in Oklahoma
Airliner accidents and incidents caused by pilot incapacitation
Aviation accidents and incidents in the United States in 1966
1966 in Oklahoma
Disasters in Oklahoma
April 1966 events in the United States